Bethany Soye is an American attorney and politician serving as a member of the South Dakota House of Representatives from the 9th district. Elected in November 2020, she assumed office on January 12, 2021.

Early life and education 
Soye was born in Chadron, Nebraska. She earned a Bachelor of Science degree in business administration from North Central University, followed by a joint Master of Public Policy and Juris Doctor from the College of William & Mary.

Career 
Soye works as a financial compliance attorney at MetaBank. She was previously a legal intern in the United States Department of Justice and served as a law clerk in the office of Senator Ted Cruz. She was also a judicial extern for the Supreme Court of Virginia. For two years, she was also a research assistant at the National Center for State Courts. Soye was elected to the South Dakota House of Representatives in November 2021 and assumed office on January 12, 2021.

References 

Living people
People from Chadron, Nebraska
North Central University alumni
College of William & Mary alumni
William & Mary Law School alumni
Republican Party members of the South Dakota House of Representatives
Women state legislators in South Dakota
People from Sioux Falls, South Dakota
Year of birth missing (living people)